Georges Delporte (10 August 1912 - 1 October 1994) was a French male water polo player. He was a member of the France men's national water polo team. He competed with the team at the 1936 Summer Olympics.

See also
 France men's Olympic water polo team records and statistics
 List of men's Olympic water polo tournament goalkeepers

References

External links
 

1912 births
1994 deaths
French male water polo players
Water polo goalkeepers
Water polo players at the 1936 Summer Olympics
Olympic water polo players of France
Sportspeople from Tourcoing
20th-century French people